The Wideopen Islands are a group of islands and rocks lying 7 nautical miles (13 km) north of Boreal Point, Joinville Island, in Antarctica. Roughly surveyed from a distance by the Falkland Islands Dependencies Survey (FIDS) in 1953–54. So named by United Kingdom Antarctic Place-Names Committee (UK-APC) in 1958 because of their exposed, isolated position on the south side of Bransfield Strait.

See also 
 List of Antarctic and sub-Antarctic islands

Islands of the Joinville Island group